Francis Paul "Frank" Scully Jr. (January 24, 1925 – November 9, 1998) was an American sailor who competed in the 1964 Summer Olympics.

He was born in Boston, Massachusetts and graduated from Harvard University in 1951.

In 1964 he won the bronze medal as crew member of the American boat Bingo in the 5.5 metre class event.

References

External links
 
 
 

1925 births
1998 deaths
American male sailors (sport)
Olympic bronze medalists for the United States in sailing
Sailors at the 1964 Summer Olympics – 5.5 Metre
Medalists at the 1964 Summer Olympics
Harvard University alumni